Still, Alive... and Well? is a Megadeth compilation album released on September 10, 2002 and is the last Megadeth release with bassist and co-founder David Ellefson until his reunion with the band eight years later. The album was released to fulfill Megadeth's record contract with Sanctuary Records after Dave Mustaine dissolved the band seemingly indefinitely when he sustained a serious nerve injury in 2002. The album's name is a quote from Dave Mustaine's answer to an interviewer's question: "What do you want written on your tombstone?"

The first six tracks (except tracks 1 & 2 though recorded on the same date as the others) are taken from the live album Rude Awakening and the remaining tracks are selections from The World Needs a Hero.

Track listing

Personnel
Dave Mustaine – guitars, lead vocals
David Ellefson – bass
Al Pitrelli – guitars, backing vocals
Jimmy DeGrasso – drums

References

Megadeth compilation albums
2002 compilation albums
Heavy metal compilation albums
Megadeth live albums